The 2017–18 Sacramento State Hornets women's basketball team represents California State University, Sacramento during the 2017–18 NCAA Division I women's basketball season. The Hornets were led by fifth year head coach Bunky Harkleroad and play their home games at Hornets Nest. They were members of the Big Sky Conference. They finished the season 7–23, 5–13 in Big Sky play to finish in a tie for ninth place. They lost in the first round of the Big Sky women's tournament to Montana.

Roster

Schedule

|-
!colspan=9 style=| Exhibition

|-
!colspan=9 style=| Non-conference regular season

|-
!colspan=9 style=| Big Sky regular season

|-
!colspan=9 style=| Big Sky Women's Tournament

See also
2017–18 Sacramento State Hornets men's basketball team

References

Sacramento State Hornets women's basketball seasons
Sacramento State